

Ethnographic Lithuania is a concept that defines Lithuanian territories as a significant part of the territories that belonged to the Grand Duchy of Lithuania and Lithuanians as all people living on them, regardless of whether those people contemporarily or currently speak the Lithuanian language and considered themselves Lithuanian. The concept was in contrast to those of "historic Lithuania", the territories of the Duchy, and the "linguistic Lithuania", the area where Lithuanian language was overwhelmingly spoken.

The concept of ethnographic Lithuania clashed with the right for self-determination of people living in that large territory, particularly Poles and Belarusians, who, according to the supporters of the ethnographic Lithuania, were "slavicized Lithuanians" who needed to be re-Lithuanized. They argued that an individual cannot decide on his ethnicity and nationality, which are decided not by language but ancestry.

In 1920 Lithuanian politician Mykolas Biržiška wrote about nationality: "One cannot define it according to the opinion of every individual. Belonging or not to a given nationality is not something everybody can decide for themselves, it is not something that can be solved according to political liberalism, even if hidden under the cloak of democratic slogans. It is too complex, too tied with ancient history, too related with the history of a given nation, for the will or passivity of any individual to challenge it. [...] Ethnographic Lithuania does not end where the locals no longer speak Lithuanian, it spreads further, to the regions which do not speak - but used to - Lithuanian, since it is composed of one Lithuanian nation, regardless of whether it speaks Lithuanian, has forgotten the language or even holds it in contempt."The geographical scope of ethnographic Lithuania was noted in 1905, the year of Great Seimas of Vilnius, when Russian prime minister Sergei Witte received the following memorial: "Lithuanians, knowing that territory inhabited by them since the historical times consists of the Lithuanian gubernyas of the Northwestern Krai: Vilna Governorate, Kovno Governorate and Grodno Governorate, part of Courland and Suwałki Governorate (incorporated into the Kingdom of Poland), consider them in the ethnographic perspective Lithuanian, and their inhabitants living there alongside the Lithuanians as either newcomers - such as Poles, Jews and Russians - or slavicized Lithuanians, such as Belarusians."Demands of this early program would only slightly be modified in the coming decades (some would also include part of the Minsk Governorate around Naugardukas and the Lithuanian Minor territory around Memel). That territory was inhabited in the early 20th century by 5,850,000 people; out of those, according to the official Russian Empire statistics, linguistic Lithuanians formed 1,659,000 - i.e. less than 30%. Out of the regions mentioned in the 1905 declaration, only the Kovno Governorate and the northern part of Suwałki Governorate had a clear Lithuanian-speaking majority.

The concept of ethnographic Lithuania conflicted with newly Polish state, which sought to recreate the Polish-Lithuanian Commonwealth.

Currently, the Republic of Lithuania has no territorial claims.

See also
Krajowcy
Lithuania proper
Lithuanian National Revival
Lithuanization
Polonization
Russification
Regions of Lithuania
Tutejszy
Miedzymorze

References

External links
T. Norus, Tomas Naruševičius, Jonas Žilius, Lithuania's case for independence. 1918. Public domain due to age. p.25-34 discuss the concept of ethnographic Lithuania

Further reading
Timothy Snyder, The Reconstruction of Nations: Poland, Ukraine, Lithuania, Belarus, 1569-1999, Yale University Press, 2003, 
Egidijus Aleksandravičius, Political goals of Lithuanians, 1863-1918, Journal of Baltic Studies, Volume 23, Issue 3 Autumn 1992, pages 227 - 238
Jakubowski J., STUDYA NAD STOSUNKAMI NARODOWOŚCIOWEMI NA LITWIE PRZED UNIĄ LUBELSKĄ, Warszawa, Prace t-wa naukowego warszawskiego, 1912, str. 1-10, 
Władysław Wielhorski, Litwa etnograficzna, Wilno, 1928
Krzysztof Buchowski, Dwudziestowieczna Litwa w historiografii Polskiej po 1989 roku
Vytautas Merkys, Tautiniai santykiai Vilniaus vyskupijoje 1798-1918 m., Vilnius, 2006

Historical regions in Lithuania